Chamaz Kola or Chammaz Kola may refer to one of several villages in Mazandaran Province, Iran:
 Chamaz Kola, Babol
 Chammaz Kola, Nur
 Chamaz Kola, Qaem Shahr